Samuel Rhoads Franklin (August 24, 1825 – February 24, 1909) was a rear admiral in the United States Navy. He participated in the important Battle of Hampton Roads off the U.S. state of Virginia in 1862, served as the superintendent of the U.S. Naval Observatory in Washington, D.C., from 1884 to 1885, and was president of the International Marine Conference of 1889.

Early life
Samuel Rhoads Franklin was born August 24, 1825, in York, Pennsylvania, to Walter S. and Sarah ( Buel) Franklin. His father was Clerk of the United States House of Representatives, and his paternal great-grandfather was Samuel Rhoads, who had served in the First Continental Congress and as Mayor of Philadelphia in 1774. The Franklins were a prominent Quaker family in New York state. One Franklin ancestor married Senator and New York Governor DeWitt Clinton, while another married New York Governor and Vice President George Clinton. Samuel was one of six children. His older brother, William Buel, was born in 1823. Another brother, Thomas, was born in 1828; a sister, Anne, in 1830; another brother, Frederick Buel, in 1832; and another brother, Walter Simonds Jr., in 1835.

Franklin attended several private schools as a youth before completing his education at York County Academy, a prep school.

Early naval career
On February 18, 1841, Franklin enlisted at the age of 15 in the United States Navy as a midshipman. As the United States Naval Academy would not be established until 1844, "midshipmen were left to educate themselves and one another. Their schools were held in receiving ships and cruising vessels, in the midst of a thousand interruptions and impediments, which render[ed] the whole system of little or no value." The United States believed war was imminent with Mexico, and the commander of the Pacific Squadron had standing orders to seize the Mexican Pacific port city of Monterey in Alta California (now part of the U.S. state of California). Hearing a false report that war had broken out, the Pacific Squadron left Lima, Peru, and seized Monterey without a fight October 19–20, 1842.

At the time, the United States had no ports on the Pacific coast of North America, and naval vessels relied on storeships—naval vessels loaded with supplies and fresh water which sat, stationary, at sea. About June 1844, Franklin left the United States to serve aboard the storeship .

Antebellum naval advancement
In late 1844, at his own request, Franklin joined the sloop-of-war . The ship spent some months cruising the North Pacific and the coast of Central America, and Franklin and some of his fellow sailors took several days to explore the interior of Nicaragua near the port city of El Realejo. When the Mexican–American War broke out in the spring of 1846, the Levant joined the Pacific Squadron and sailed to Monterey again. Franklin took part in the landing party which captured the city (uncontested) on July 7.

The Levant was ordered to return to the United States shortly thereafter. The ship arrived in Norfolk, Virginia, on April 28, 1847. Although Franklin could have joined the Class of 1847 immediately, it would have left him just two months to prepare for his examination.  He therefore decided to put off entrance at the Naval Academy until October, and spent the months of July, August, and September at home in York, Pennsylvania. Upon his entry to the Naval Academy, on August 10, 1847, Franklin was promoted to "passed midshipman". Instruction lasted nine months, and Franklin passed. He was assigned to the United States Coast Survey, which he joined in mid-July 1848. The survey team spent the autumn months surveying the coast beginning at Cape Henlopen, Delaware; moving south to the tip of the Delmarva Peninsula; and up and down the east and west coasts of Chesapeake Bay. The winter was spent in quarters in Washington, D.C., and survey work resumed in the spring of 1849.

In mid-spring 1849, Franklin was ordered to leave the U.S. Coast Survey and report to the razeed , then being fitted out in Norfolk as the flagship of the Mediterranean Squadron. The Independence sailed for the Mediterranean Sea on July 26, 1849. After an uneventful three-year cruise, the ship returned to Norfolk in June 1852 and was sent to drydock in New York City, where she arrived on July 3, 1852.

Franklin was given three months' leave, but was ordered to report to the sloop-of-war  for another three-year cruise of the Mediterranean before it was up. The Dolphin was to cruise the northern Atlantic Ocean, taking deep-sea soundings to determine whether a subsurface ridge, plateau, or mount existed on which an undersea telegraph cable might be laid. In March 1853, the Dolphin made port at Norfolk, and Franklin was assigned to the U.S. Coast Survey again. He helped survey the coast around Woods Hole, Massachusetts; Sandy Hook, New Jersey; and along New England in the fall of 1853, wintered in Washington, D.C., again, and in the spring of 1854 worked around Nantucket Shoals off Nantucket Island, Massachusetts.

In October 1854, Franklin was reassigned to the Naval Academy, where he served as a disciplinary officer in the Executive Department. He was promoted to Master on April 18, 1855. Unhappy acting as a spy on midshipmen, he requested a transfer to the Department of Ethics and English Studies, which was granted in the fall of 1855. He was promoted to lieutenant on September 14, 1855, making his naval rank commensurate with his instructor's status.

The Falmouth was in drydock, and did not relaunch until January 12, 1857. She was assigned to the Brazil Squadron, an understrength group of vessels patrolling the coast of South America from Venezuela to the Falkland Islands with the goal of protecting American shipping, indicting the West African slave trade, and protect American interests in the emerging region. During this time, the Falmouth participated in the Paraguay expedition, and cruised the Paraná River and Río de la Plata until April 1859. The Falmouth then returned to New York City on May 19, 1859, and was decommissioned.

After three months of leave, Franklin was assigned in September 1859 to the Ordnance Department of the Washington Navy Yard in Washington, D.C. After a few months, he was transferred to the U.S. Naval Observatory across town. Neither duty involved any training or experience; officers were expected to pick up knowledge on their own, and Franklin strongly disliked the work. He left the Observatory in mid-1860 and took several months' leave again.

Civil War duty
In late 1860, Franklin was assigned to the sloop-of-war . The ship was part of the Home Squadron, which patrolled the East Coast and Gulf Coast, suppressing piracy and the slave trade and assisting ships in distress. Franklin set sail from Portsmouth, New Hampshire, on the Macedonian on January 12, 1860. The American Civil War was on the verge of breaking out, and secessionists had seized the harbor at Pensacola, Florida. The ship stopped at the U.S. Navy base at Key West, Florida, and the Dry Tortugas. While at the Dry Tortugas, Franklin met Lieutenant Colonel Montgomery C. Meigs, then somewhat furtively taking stock of the various United States ports, forts, and harbors in the Deep South with an eye toward holding them if war broke out. Meanwhile, with the end of the Mexican-American War in 1847, Mexico had slid further into turmoil. With foreign intervention looming and a possible civil war, the Navy ordered the Macedonian to depart for the Mexican city of Veracruz to monitor events in that nation. Arriving at Veracruz, Franklin remained with the ship for some months before the Macedonian began patrolling the Gulf of Mexico and the West Indies. She received orders to sail for the Boston Navy Yard, reaching Massachusetts on January 16, 1862.

Battle of Hampton Roads
With the Civil War raging, Franklin was ordered back to the Washington Navy Yard, where he assisted in outfitting the gunboat .

While Franklin waited, the Confederate States Navy completed construction of the ironclad warship CSS Virginia. Development and construction of the warship was widely reported in the North, which was deeply alarmed. On March 4, 1862, the Virginia was declared ready for combat. The Roanoke and the Minnesota were both steamships, and the most powerful warships in the Union naval squadron. But Roanoke's main shaft had been damaged four months earlier, and a replacement shaft was delayed due to the crush of wartime production orders. Instead, she relied on steam tugboats and her sails for maneuverability. Roanoke's captain, John Marston, was acting commander of the flotilla.

The Virginia entered Hampton Roads at 1:30 PM, and by 2:20 PM had engaged the Cumberland. The Roanoke passed the Rip Raps (a small, man-made island in the harbor's mouth) about the same time, she and her three tugs struggling against the current. As she passed Sewell's Point, Confederate shore batteries fired on her. She returned fire, but her  gun was too weak to reach them in return. By 2:55 PM, Virginia had critically injured Congress, and 10 minutes later rammed Cumberland. After being bombarded by Virginia, Cumberland sank at 3:25 PM. Minnesota ran firmly aground at 3:10 PM, and St. Lawrence at 5:30 PM. Roanoke withdrew at 4:10 PM. She ran aground on a shoal about 4:30 PM, although the tide lifted her off again a few minutes later, and she returned to Fort Monroe and the safety of the Union shore guns. By 5:45 PM, Congress had surrendered and was afire, and Virginia shelled both the Minnesota and St. Lawrence. But darkness began to fall, and the Confederate ship retreated to Sewell's Point for the night.

At 9:00 PM, the  dropped anchor beside Minnesota. When the battle began again at about 8:30 AM on March 9, the only two ships to engage in active battle were the Virginia and Monitor (although the Minnesota, still aground, fired shots to defend herself).

Dacotah
The Roanoke departed for New York City after the battle, leaving Franklin ashore for a few days until the Dacotah arrived. The ship was assigned to the North Atlantic Blocking Squadron, serving in the waters off Hampton Roads as part of the Union blockade of the Confederacy. On May 18 and 19, 1862, Franklin and the Dacotah participated in an exchange of gunfire with Confederate shore batteries at Sewell's Point. He witnessed the scuttling and burning of the Virginia on May 11, 1862, and cruised to New Orleans, Louisiana, to deliver messages before returning Hampton Roads in late June. The Dacotah then joined the James River Flotilla, destroying forts along the James River.

Aroostook
Franklin was promoted to lieutenant commander on July 16.

On August 31, the James River Flotilla was disbanded on the orders of Secretary of the Navy Gideon Welles,{{sfn|"Navy, U.S., Operations of" in The American Annual Cyclopedia|1863|page=640}} and Aroostook was assigned to the Potomac Flotilla, which was based at the Washington Navy Yard. After the Battle of Antietam on September 17, 1862, largely ended the Confederate threat to the national capital, Franklin was ordered to take Aroostook to the Gulf of Mexico and join the West Gulf Blockading Squadron. Arriving October 22, she joined the forces blockading Mobile Bay, Alabama.

Franklin saw his first extensive action while with the West Gulf Blockading Squadron. Her first major action occurred on the night of December 15, when she gave chase to a blockade runner attempting to flee. Although Aroostook lost sight of the ship, the next day they discovered the schooner stranded on shoals and aflame. In another action on March 5, 1863, Aroostook and another Union vessel destroyed the blockade runner SS Josephine. Aroostook attempted to intercept a small blockade runner on the night of March 6, but it escaped them and made it into Mobile Bay. Aroostook exchanged fire with shore batteries on April 19, captured the blockade runner SS Sea Lion on the evening of May 9, assisted in the capture of the SS Hunter on May 18, and again exchanged shore fire on June 23. At about 1:00 AM on July 17, Aroostook assisted in the capture of the SS James Battle.

Other Civil War duty
Franklin was relieved of command of Aroostook on July 28, 1863. With his old command of Aroostook already filled, he had no ready shipboard duty. Instead, the Navy assigned him to the staff of Commodore Henry H. Bell, Commander-in-Chief of the West Gulf Blockading Squadron. Bell was new to the job, Rear Admiral David Farragut having recently departed for consultations and a different command. Bell appointed Franklin his Fleet Captain (chief of staff to a flag officer).

Farragut resumed command of the West Gulf Blockading Squadron in December 1863 and on January 19, 1864, his flagship (the ) anchored off Mobile Bay. Farragut relieved Franklin, appointing Captain Percival Drayton Fleet Captain in his stead. Franklin's new assignment was as Fleet Captain on the staff of Commodore James Shedden Palmer, senior officer of U.S. naval forces on the Mississippi River in the vicinity of New Orleans. Admiral Farragut then won the Battle of Mobile Bay, but the city of Mobile did not surrender. Farragut asked to be relieved of command to take up other duties, and Palmer was appointed commander of the West Gulf Blockading Squadron on November 17, 1864. When Palmer departed for the New York Navy Yard, Acting Rear Admiral Henry K. Thatcher was appointed commander of the squadron on February 23, 1865. Franklin remained on Thatcher's staff as Fleet Captain, and was the naval representative on the Union delegation which accepted the surrender of Mobile on April 12, 1865.

The Civil War had effectively ended on April 9, 1865, when General Robert E. Lee surrendered to General Ulysses S. Grant at Appomattox Courthouse in Virginia.

Post-war duty

Shipboard commands
On February 5, 1866, Captain Robert Wainwright Scott of the  died suddenly while the ship was at Acapulco, Mexico. Saginaw had spent the last six months of 1865 protecting American citizens and interests at various ports on Mexico's Pacific coast. Franklin traveled by ship to Panama, crossed the Isthmus of Panama by rail, and sailed to Acapulco to take up command of Saginaw. Saginaw reached San Francisco, California, in March 1866, and spent five months undergoing repairs at the Mare Island Naval Shipyard. She received orders to assist settlers in the Washington Territory, and said in August 1866 to Puget Sound. She then received orders to proceed to Esquimalt Harbour on Vancouver Island in Canada, where she spent several months assisting the Western Union in laying a telegraph cable across the Bering Strait. She returned to Mare Island in December 1866.  Franklin was promoted to commander on July 25 or September 26, 1866 (sources differ as to the date).

Shortly after his return to Mare Island, Franklin was appointed Inspector of Ordnance at Mare Island. In late 1868 or early 1869, he was given command of the sllop-of-war . Mohican had been decommissioned on April 3, 1868, but was undergoing refit and recommissioning.  She launched again on June 7, 1869, and Franklin was ordered to take a scientific party to Siberia so it could observe a solar eclipse. Sailing east across the Pacific, Franklin returned to Esquimalt Harbour, where he was instructed to set sail on October 11 for Hawaii. Franklin met King Kamehameha V of the Kingdom of Hawaii, as well as the future queen, Liliuokalani. Mohican returned to Mare island on January 11, 1870.

Franklin was assigned to equipment duty at Mare Island upon his return, and served in that capacity until mid 1872. He was ordered back east to the newly constructed New London Naval Station in Connecticut. He served at new London from July to September 1872, during which time he was promoted to captain on August 13, 1872. He was transferred to the Washington Navy Yard in September 1872, serving there until December. After two months' leave, he was appointed Executive Office of the New London Naval Station, returning to duty there on March 1, 1873.

He sailed on a civilian ship for the United Kingdom and spent time visiting London before sailing to France and touring Paris. He then traveled overland to Villefranche-sur-Mer on the Mediterranean coast of France, where he joined the Wabash. Franklin cruised the Mediterranean Sea until November 30, 1873, he received orders to head for Key West, Florida. The Virginius Affair had caused a war scare between the United States and Spain, and Wabash headed for Florida in case the Navy needed ships to invade Cuba. Wabash arrived in Key West on January 3, 1874. She never left port again, and was decommissioned on April 25, 1874.

When Admiral Case retired, Franklin was named chief of staff to his successor, Rear Admiral John Lorimer Worden. Franklin had been decommissioned in 1871, but was recommissioned on December 15, 1873. Franklin departed Key West on April 11, 1874, and after an uneventful tour of duty she sailed for Norfolk, arriving on September 14, 1876.

Shore duties
After a brief tenure as the executive officer of the Gosport Naval Yard in Norfolk, Virginia, during which time he was president of the Board for Promotion of Officers, Franklin spent similarly short periods of time as the executive officer of the New London Naval Station and then the Washington Navy Yard. In 1877, he was assigned as a hydrographer to the United States Hydrographic Office, and on June 1, 1878, was appointed by the president of the United States to a one-year term on the board of visitors of the United States Military Academy at West Point, New York. (He spent the last six months of 1880 on leave.)

At the end of 1880, Franklin was assigned to special duty in the Bureau of Equipment in the Navy Department. He was promoted to commodore on May 28, 1881, and in 1882 appointed to the board of visitors of the United States Naval Academy at Annapolis.  He was named the board's president in June. On June 16, 1883, he was appointed president of the Board of Examiners again. His duty station changed when in February 1884 he was appointed superintendent of the Naval Observatory in Washington, D.C.

Final duties
Franklin now had just three and a half years of service remaining before retirement, and fully expected to serve out his remaining years at the Naval Observatory. The following month he was named commander-in-chief of the European Squadron. He assumed his duties on June 10, 1885, serving aboard the Pensacola until his retirement in August 1887.

Franklin retired from the navy on August 24, 1887, at the age of 62. According to maritime historian Hans Van Tilburg, throughout his career Franklin was well liked and competent.  But he was prone to sloth.

Personal life
On January 10, 1883, Franklin married Marion Sands, daughter of Rear Admiral Benjamin F. and Helen M. ( French) Sands. Her maternal uncle was United States Army General William H. French. Marion had previously been married to Arthur Henry Dutton, a U.S. Army engineer and brevet brigadier general who died in battle in 1864.

The Franklins never had children. Mrs. Franklin had a son, Arthur Henry Dutton, Jr., (born in 1864) from her previous marriage.

Franklin converted to Roman Catholicism in 1880.

Retirement and death
Franklin lived in Washington, D.C., in retirement. He joined the Metropolitan Club, the Sons of the Revolution, the Washington Monument Society, the Memorial Society of the City of Washington, the Society of Foreign Wars, the Society of the Cincinnati, the Pennsylvania Military Order, and the Chevy Chase Club.

In February 1889, President Grover Cleveland appointed Franklin a member of the U.S. delegation to the International Marine Conference. When the conference met in Washington in October, Franklin was appointed its president on October 16. Franklin later sued the United States government over his remuneration for this event. The U.S. law establishing the conference allowed salaried military officers to be paid their expenses, but nothing more. Other delegates received $5,000 ($ in  dollars). Franklin sued to gain his $5,000, but the United States Court of Claims held that his Navy pension qualified as salary, and denied relief.

In 1898, Franklin authored a memoir, Memories of a Rear-Admiral Who Has Served for More Than Half a Century in the Navy of the United States''.

After several weeks of illness, Samuel Rhoads Franklin died at his home in Washington, D.C., on February 24, 1909, of chronic kidney failure. His funeral was held at the Cathedral of St. Matthew the Apostle, and he was buried at Arlington National Cemetery.

References
Notes

Citations

Bibliography

1825 births
1909 deaths
United States Naval Academy alumni
Union Navy officers
United States Navy rear admirals (upper half)
People from York, Pennsylvania
People from Washington, D.C.
Burials at Arlington National Cemetery
Franklin military family